"Love Is the Foundation" is the title track from the 1973 album by Loretta Lynn.  "Love Is the Foundation", written by William Cody Hall, was Lynn's seventh number one on the U.S. country singles chart as a solo artist.  The single stayed at number one for two weeks and spent a total of thirteen weeks on the chart.

Chart performance

References

1975 singles
Loretta Lynn songs
Song recordings produced by Owen Bradley
MCA Records singles
1973 songs